Mazonia is an unincorporated community in Braceville Township, Grundy County, Illinois, United States.

References

Unincorporated communities in Illinois
Unincorporated communities in Grundy County, Illinois